is a song by Japanese rock band Asian Kung-Fu Generation. It was released as the third and last single of their fifth studio album, World World World, on February 6, 2008. The song was first introduced late 2007 during a live, onstage performance in Korea while the band was on its Project Beef tour. The song was ranked 8th on fans request for band's 10th anniversary live setlist on September 14, 2013.

In December 2022, the song was used as the ending for the final episode of anime Bocchi the Rock!, where it was covered by Kessoku Band from the series.

Music video
The music video for "Korogaru Iwa, Kimi ni Asa ga Furu" was directed by Kazuyoshi Oku. The music video primarily centers around a young boy planting and watching a seed sprout in flowerpot.

Track listing

Personnel
Masafumi Gotō – lead vocals, rhythm guitar
Kensuke Kita – lead guitar, background vocals
Takahiro Yamada –  bass, background vocals
Kiyoshi Ijichi – drums
Asian Kung-Fu Generation – producer
Yusuke Nakamura – single cover art

Charts

External links

References

Asian Kung-Fu Generation songs
2008 singles
Songs written by Masafumi Gotoh
Ki/oon Music singles
2008 songs